Donald Joseph Grosso (April 12, 1915 – May 14, 1985) was a Canadian ice hockey forward. He was born in Sault Ste. Marie, Ontario.

Grosso started his National Hockey League career with the Detroit Red Wings.  He would also play with the Boston Bruins and Chicago Black Hawks.  His career lasted from 1938 to 1947.  Grosso would win one Stanley Cup in his career in 1943 with Detroit.

Career statistics

External links

1915 births
1985 deaths
Boston Bruins players
Canadian ice hockey centres
Chicago Blackhawks players
Detroit Red Wings players
Sportspeople from Sault Ste. Marie, Ontario
Stanley Cup champions
Ice hockey people from Ontario
Canadian expatriates in the United States